Brownsville is a city in and the county seat of Haywood County, Tennessee, United States, located in the western  Its population as of the 2010 census was 10,292, with a decrease to 9,788 at the 2020 census. The city is named after General Jacob Jennings Brown, an American officer of the War of 1812.

History

Brownsville was a trading center that developed in association with cotton plantations and commodity agriculture in the lowlying Delta of the Mississippi River around Memphis, Tennessee and West Tennessee. It is located north of the Hatchie River, a tributary of the Mississippi, which originally served as the main transportation routes to markets for cotton. The land was developed by planters for cotton plantations, and worked by large numbers of enslaved persons now called African Americans, who made up a majority of the town and county population.

The town is notable for its many well-preserved  homes owned by wealthy planters before the Civil War, and multi-generational family-owned farms.

The Tabernacle Campground was founded in 1826 by the Rev. Howell Taylor, soon after Brownsville was founded. In the 21st century, it serves as the site of an annual "camp-meeting" for descendants of Taylor.

In the mid to late 19th century, German Jewish immigrants also settled in Brownsville. They founded a congregation in the 1860s, and built Temple Adas Israel in 1882. It is listed on the National Register of Historic Places. The building is believed to be the oldest synagogue in Tennessee, and is a rare example of a synagogue built in the Gothic Revival style.

Through the late 19th century, whites worked to re-establish supremacy after Reconstruction and impose Jim Crow and second-class status on African Americans. Tennessee effectively disenfranchised most blacks in the state after the turn of the 20th century, excluding them from the political system and destroying what had been a competitive system. The state's congressional delegation and elected officials became predominantly white Democrats. The exception was East Tennessee, where white Republicans formed the majority. The region of yeomen farmers had been mostly Unionist-leaning during the Civil War.

Among the city's contemporary attractions is the West Tennessee Delta Heritage Center, which interprets the delta region.

Lynchings for control
From the late 19th into the early 20th century, whites lynched three African-American men in Brownsville, two in the 20th century.

In the late 1930s, with Haywood County's black majority disenfranchised, in 1939 a number of blacks in Brownsville founded a local NAACP chapter. They worked to assert their right to register and vote in the presidential election of 1940. In June 1940 threats were made against the group, and Elisha Davis was kidnapped by a large white mob. They demanded the names of NAACP members and their plans. He fled town, followed by his family, losing his successful service station and all their property.

On June 20, 1940, Elbert Williams, secretary of the NAACP chapter, and Elisha's brother Thomas Davis were questioned by police. Thomas Davis was released, but Williams was never seen alive again. His body was found in the Hatchie River a few days later, with bullet holes in his chest. He is considered to be the first NAACP member to have been lynched for civil rights activities; he is the last recorded lynching victim in the state. Several other NAACP members were run out of town by police, fearing for their lives.

Thurgood Marshall of the NAACP conducted an investigation of Williams' murder and appealed to the Department of Justice to prosecute the case, providing affidavits of witnesses. FBI agents were sent to the town in September to protect blacks wanting to register to vote, but the local people were fearful because there had been no prosecution of Williams' killers. In October 1940, The Crisis, the magazine of the NAACP, reported that no blacks registered to vote. Thomas Davis and his family moved North and resettled in Niles, Michigan. The DOJ closed the Williams case in 1942.

A retired white Tennessee lawyer, Jim Emison, has joined the family and other supporters in working in the 21st century to bring justice to Williams. Since 2012 he has been working on the case, based on contemporary Department of Justice files and his own research. He turned over his materials to DOJ in 2015, asking them to re-open the case. 

In 2015, the Tennessee Historical Commission approved an official historical marker honoring Elbert Williams. It was dedicated in Brownsville on June 20, 2015, at a memorial service marking the seventy-fifth anniversary of Williams' murder. The featured speaker was NAACP President Cornell W. Brooks.

Geography
Brownsville is located in central Haywood County. U.S. Routes 70 and 79 form a bypass around the southern and eastern sides of the city. US 79 leads northeast  to Humboldt, while US 70 leads east  to Jackson. The two highways together leads southwest  to Memphis.

Brownsville is situated on the southeastern edge of the New Madrid Seismic Zone, an area with a high earthquake risk.

The Hatchie River passes south of Brownsville. It is the longest free-flowing tributary of the lower Mississippi, and contains the largest forested floodplain in Tennessee. The river is home to hundreds of species of fish, including 11 species of catfish, and the alligator snapping turtle. The Hatchie River was named by the Nature Conservancy as one of the "great places" to save. The Hatchie is designated as a "scenic river" under the Tennessee Wild and Scenic Rivers Act.

Climate
The climate in this area is characterized by hot, humid summers and generally mild to cool winters.  According to the Köppen Climate Classification system, Brownsville has a humid subtropical climate, abbreviated "Cfa" on climate maps.

Demographics

2020 census

As of the 2020 United States census, there were 9,788 people, 4,001 households, and 2,428 families residing in the city.

2000 census
As of the census of 2000, there were 10,748 people, 4,105 households, and 2,865 families residing in the city. The population density was 1,178.1 people per square mile (455.0/km2). There were 4,372 housing units at an average density of 479.2 per square mile (185.1/km2). The racial makeup of the city was 60.72% African American, 36.52% White, 0.14% Native American, 0.10% Asian, 0.07% Pacific Islander, 1.83% from other races, and 0.61% from two or more races. Hispanic or Latino of any race were 3.61% of the population.

There were 4,105 households, out of which 35.4% had children under the age of 18 living with them, 38.8% were married couples living together, 27.3% had a female householder with no husband present, and 30.2% were non-families. 27.0% of all households were made up of individuals, and 11.8% had someone living alone who was 65 years of age or older. The average household size was 2.58 and the average family size was 3.11.

In the city, the population was spread out, with 29.5% under the age of 18, 10.4% from 18 to 24, 27.1% from 25 to 44, 19.4% from 45 to 64, and 13.6% who were 65 years of age or older. The median age was 33 years. For every 100 females, there were 80.2 males. For every 100 females age 18 and over, there were 73.3 males.

The median income for a household in the city was $27,276, and the median income for a family was $33,782. Males had a median income of $30,313 versus $22,030 for females. The per capita income for the city was $15,217. About 18.0% of families and 21.3% of the population were below the poverty line, including 26.3% of those under age 18 and 27.0% of those age 65 or over.

Arts

Pioneer musicians
Blues singer and guitarist Sleepy John Estes was born in Ripley (Nutbush) and later moved to Brownsville in 1915.

Yank Rachell, blues artist and mandolin player, was born in Brownsville in the early 1900s. He recorded, and toured in Europe and Japan. Shortly before his death in 1997, he returned to Brownsville to perform Jug Band recordings with John Sebastian and the J-Band.

Contemporary music
In the song "Delta Dawn" (recorded by Tanya Tucker and others), the lyric "All the folks around Brownsville say she's crazy," is a reference to Brownsville, Tennessee. Songwriter Alex Harvey and former child rockabilly star Larry Collins are credited with the song.

Singer and actress Tina Turner was born at Brownsville's Haywood Memorial Hospital on November 26, 1939. Her father was a farm overseer in Nutbush. As a child, she lived in the Knoxville area, Nutbush, Ripley, and Brownsville.

Notable people
 Son Bonds (1909–1947), musician
 Paul Burlison (1929–2003), rockabilly pioneer, guitarist, member of The Rock and Roll Trio
 Tony Delk (born 1974), basketball player and coach, graduated from Haywood High School
 Clay Evans (1925–2019), gospel singer, pastor and founder of Fellowship Missionary Baptist Church in Chicago, Illinois
 Rockey Felker (born 1953), football player and coach
 Joseph Folk (1869–1923), Circuit Attorney of the city of St. Louis, later 31st governor of Missouri
 Alfred Alexander Freeman (1838–1926), politician and judge, candidate for governor in 1872
 Richard Halliburton (1900–1939), adventurer and author
 Brett Scallions (born 1971), frontman of the band Fuel
 Jim Thaxton (born 1949), football player
 Billy Tripp (born 1955), author and artist
 Tina Turner (born 1939), singer and actress, who lived in nearby Nutbush as a child.
 Jarvis Varnado (born 1988), basketball player for Hapoel Gilboa Galil
 Elbert Williams, African-American civil rights activist, lived in Brownsville and was lynched here in 1940
 William Ridley Wills, American poet, novelist, newspaperman 
 William Ridley Wills (Insurance executive), Founder of National Life and Accident Insurance Company
 T. I. Webb Jr. (golfer)

Politics
Haywood County was the only county in Tennessee outside of the two biggest cities of Nashville and Memphis to vote for Democratic candidate Hillary Clinton in the 2016 presidential election. Most of its African-American residents support the Democratic Party.

References

Further reading
Richard A. Couto, Lifting the Veil, A Political History of Struggles for Emancipation (Knoxville: The University of Tennessee Press, 1993)
 
Raye Springfield, The Legacy of Tamar, Courage and Faith in an African American Family (Knoxville: University of Tennessee Press, 2000)
Patricia Sullivan, Lift Every Voice, The NAACP and the Making of the Civil Rights Movement (New York: The New Press, 2009)

External links

 City of Brownsville official website
 City charter
 Things to do and see in Brownsville and Haywood County, Tennessee
 West Tennessee Delta Heritage Museum

Cities in Haywood County, Tennessee
Cities in Tennessee
County seats in Tennessee
Majority-minority cities and towns in Tennessee